Harsha Bahadur Bura Magar is a famous social worker and scholar of Nepal. He was the first PhD degree holder in political science from Magar community in Nepal. His contributions in different fields inspire others to follow his path.

Birthplace
Harsha Bahadur Bura Magar was born at Harichaur VDC-6, Galkot, Baglung District, Dhaulagiri Zone, Nepal in 1937 (Bikram Sambat 1984,Kartik 3). His father's name was Bhakta Bahadur Bura Magar and his mother was Devikala Bura Magar. He presently lives at Lalitpur Sub Metropolitan City-4, Bagdol, Nepal.

Education
Bura Magar started his education at Hindi Urdu Middle English School, Digboi, India in 1945. He passed the Army Special Certificate of Education Exam in Second Division from Indian Army School in 1953. He passed I.A. from Ilahabad, India in 1960. He became a graduate from Agra University, India in 1963. He got a master's degree in political science from Tribhuvan University, Nepal in 1967. In 1991, he got a PhD degree in political science from Patna University, India.

Works
Magar had published 17 books by 2000. The books ranged across biography, history, literature, linguistics and politics. 15 out of 17 books were written in the Nepali language whereas two of them were written in English.

Awards
Burma Star, 1939-45 War Star, India Service Medal, General Service Medal with Class, South East Asia, Indian Independence Medal, Military Service Medal Jammu & Kashmir (1949-55), Shree 5 Birendra Rajyavishek Medal, Mahendra Vidhyabhusan "Ka" Grade, Prabal Gorkha Dakshin Bahu etc.

See also
 Magar people

References

1937 births
Living people
Nepalese academics
Nepalese social workers
People from Baglung District